Crassilabrum is a genus of sea snails, marine gastropod mollusks in the family Muricidae, the murex snails or rock snails.

Species
Species within the genus Crassilabrum include:

 Crassilabrum crassilabrum (Sowerby, 1834)

References

Ocenebrinae
Monotypic gastropod genera